Trypodendron lineatum, known generally as striped ambrosia beetle, is a species of typical bark beetle in the family Curculionidae. Other common names include the two-striped timber beetle, conifer ambrosia beetle, and spruce timber beetle. It is found in Europe and North America.

References

Further reading

External links

 

Scolytinae
Articles created by Qbugbot